Kolkata Knight Riders (KKR) are a franchise cricket team based in Kolkata, India, which plays in the Indian Premier League (IPL). They are one of the eight teams that competed in the 2016 Indian Premier League. They were captained by Gautam Gambhir, and had new coaching staff for the season. Jacques Kallis was head coach in the place of Trevor Bayliss, while Wasim Akram became the new bowling coach.

Indian Premier League

Season standings

Match log

References

Kolkata Knight Riders seasons
2016 Indian Premier League